Raven's Cabin, also known under the working title Redback, is an independent Australian thriller film shot in the outback area of Perth, Western Australia. The film is directed by Loren Johnson and stars Luke Ledger.

Plot
At a wilderness boot camp for difficult teens, the desperate spirit of an alleged suicide victim seeks out the help of a young girl to expose the truth about her death.

Cast

 Andrea Burdett as  Andrea Briggs 
 Luke Ledger as Brian Carter 
 Pia Prendiville as Jessica Howell 
 Mauricio Merino Jr as Daniel Watts 
 John McPherson as Harris 
 Neal Huxley as Parker 
 Jag Pannu as Jack Tyler 

 David Ryan Kinsman as Cole Martin 
 Elizabeth Frodsham as Claire Abbotts 
 Scott O'Keeffe as Mechanic 
 Laura Fairclough as Sarah White 
 Leon Grey as Steven Wong 
 Blake Prosser as Ryan Clarke 
 Bradley Stevens as Billy

Production

Filming began in the outback hills of Western Australia Australia, forty five minutes outside of Perth in early May 2010.

References

External links
 

Australian thriller films
2010 thriller films
2010 films
Films shot in Perth, Western Australia
2010s English-language films
2010s Australian films